"She Wouldn't Be Gone" is a song written by Jennifer Adan and Cory Batten and recorded by American country music singer Blake Shelton.  It was released in August 2008 as the first single from Shelton's 2008 album Startin' Fires.  The song became Shelton's fifth number one hit on the US Billboard Hot Country Songs chart in February 2009.

Content
"She Wouldn't Be Gone" is a mid-tempo in which the male narrator reflects on his relationship and a lover who has just left him. He expresses regrets over having not attempted to keep her from leaving, saying that if he had tried to keep her (by bringing her flowers, watching sunsets with her, and paying attention to her needs), thinking "maybe she wouldn't be gone".

Co-writer Cory Batten came up with the song's opening line ("Red roadside wildflower, if I had only picked you / Took you home and set you on the counter / Oh, at least a time or two / Maybe she'd have thought it through") after seeing a patch of red wildflowers outside his window. Co-writer Jennifer Adan said that she wanted the song's narrator to have a "feeling of desperation" by realizing after how what he should have done to keep his lover from leaving. When he recorded the song, Shelton said that he had "been able to dump more emotion into that vocal" than any of his previous material.

Critical reception
Brady Vercher of Engine 145 gave the song a "thumbs down". He stated that "Shelton's phrasing and breathing are awkward enough to not make the song easily memorable or singable, decreasing its chances at chart success." Allmusic's Steve Leggett considered it the strongest track on Startin' Fires, saying that it was "a brilliant portrayal of a man who finally finds his passion and love for a woman when it's way too late and she's already gone, and the chorus swells to passionate, almost white-knuckle perfection. It's a great song and Shelton gives it everything."

Music video
The music video was directed by Scott Speer and premiered in late 2008.

Chart positions

Year-end charts

Certifications

References

2008 singles
Country ballads
2000s ballads
Blake Shelton songs
Music videos directed by Scott Speer
Song recordings produced by Scott Hendricks
Warner Records Nashville singles
2008 songs
Songs written by Cory Batten